Hits 99 is a compilation album released in 1998. As a part of the Hits compilation series, it contains UK hit singles from the second half of 1998. The album reached number 2 on the UK compilations chart.

Track listing

Disc one
 Cher - "Believe"
 B*Witched - "Rollercoaster"
 Five - "Until the Time Is Through"
 Steps - "Heartbeat"
 Will Smith - "Miami"
 Another Level - "Guess I Was a Fool"
 The Tamperer featuring Maya - "If You Buy This Record (Your Life Will Be Better)"
 Touch and Go - "Would You?"
 Spacedust - "Gym and Tonic"
 Jay-Z - "Hard Knock Life"
 Fatboy Slim - "Build It Up - Tear It Down" (mistitled on some releases as "Gangster Trippin'")
 Sash! - "Mysterious Times"
 Billie - "Because We Want To"
 T-Spoon - "Tom's Party"
 Sham Rock - "Tell Me Ma"
 Aqua - "My Oh My"
 4 the Cause - "Stand By Me"
 Lutricia McNeal - "Somebody Loves You Honey"
 Boyzone - "All That I Need"
 All Saints - "War of Nerves ('98 Remix)"

Disc two
 The Corrs - "So Young"
 Manic Street Preachers - "The Everlasting"
 Space - "We've Gotta Get Out Of This Place"
 Stereophonics - "The Bartender and the Thief"
 Republica - "From Rush Hour With Love"
 Catatonia - "Game On"
 Natalie Imbruglia - "Smoke"
 Jennifer Paige - "Crush"
 M People - "Testify"
 Monica - "The First Night"
 Tatyana Ali - "Daydreamin'"
 Jungle Brothers - "Because I Got It Like That '98"
 Meja - "All 'Bout the Money"
 Tina Cousins - "Pray"
 Matthew Marsden featuring Destiny's Child - "She's Gone"
 Sparkle - "Time To Move On"
 Des'ree - "What's Your Sign?"
 LeAnn Rimes - "Blue"
 Sarah McLachlan - "Adia"
 Alberta - "Yo-Yo Boy"

External links
 Discogs entry for Hits 99

1998 compilation albums
Hits (compilation series) albums